Amesia sanguiflua is a moth of the family Zygaenidae. It is found in northern India, Myanmar, Indochina, the Malay Peninsula, Sumatra, Java, and Taiwan.

Subspecies
Amesia sanguiflua sanguiflua (main subspecies) (Drury, 1773) (northern India, Myanmar, Indochina, and the Malay Peninsula)
Amesia sanguiflua lugens (Dohrn, 1906) (Sumatra)
Amesia sanguiflua gedeana Frustorfer, 1897 (Java)
Amesia sanguiflua viriditincta Hampson, 1919 (Taiwan)

External links and Resources
Japanese moths

Chalcosiinae
Moths of Asia
Moths of Indonesia
Moths of Malaysia
Moths of Taiwan
Moths described in 1773
Taxa named by Dru Drury